Sakari Ainali (3 December 1874 - 31 October 1938) was a Finnish farmer, businessman, lay preacher and politician, born in Himanka. He was a member of the Parliament of Finland from 1924 to 1929 and from 1930 to 1933, representing the National Coalition Party.

References

1874 births
1938 deaths
People from Kalajoki
People from Vaasa Province (Grand Duchy of Finland)
Finnish Lutherans
National Coalition Party politicians
Members of the Parliament of Finland (1924–27)
Members of the Parliament of Finland (1927–29)
Members of the Parliament of Finland (1930–33)